Kahale, is a mountain village in the district of Aley (Caza Aley), Lebanon, 13 km from Beirut. Population estimated at 11,000 residents, most of whom are Maronite Catholic.

Etymology
Kahale is derived from Syriac and Aramaic, from kah (verb meaning breathed or respired); al or el (the name of the Canaanite god El, who was considered the father of God and of mankind); and e (an ending denoting that the god El is the speaker's god).

Geography
Considering the locale and geography of the Kahale this name is suited well. A valley extends from the Sh'har west side of the Kahale into the Rjoum, eastern side of the Kahale.

History
In 1838, Eli Smith noted  the place, called el-Kahhaleh, located in El-Ghurb el-Fokany; Upper el-Ghurb.

Religion
Kahale has a predominantly Maronite Catholic population.

The village has three churches:
Mar Elias (مار الياس )
Our Lady (السيدة)
Mar Antonios (مار انطونيوس)

This in addition to Don Bosco monastery and school, and Saint Charbel Home for the elderly which is now closed.

References

Bibliography

Abi Khalil, Charbel. (1997). History of the Kahale. Beirut: The Arabic Press.

External links
 Kahhaleh, Localiban
https://web.archive.org/web/20060901151618/http://www.kahale.net/

Populated places in Aley District
Maronite Christian communities in Lebanon